, née , is a Japanese actress from Oki District, Shimane Prefecture, Japan.

In 1995, she married comedian Kuniyuki Fukasawa.

Filmography

Film
 ダイアモンドは傷つかない (Daiamondo wa kizutsukanai) (1982)
 丑三つの村 (Ushimitsu no mura) (1983)
 The Horizon (地平線) (1984/1985)
 Gonza the Spearman (1986)
 近松門左衛門 鑓の権三 (1986)
 愛はクロスオーバー (Ai wa kurosuiubaa) (1987)
 彼女が水着にきがえたら (1989)
 べっぴんの町 (Beppin no machi) (1989) 
 Roar of the Crowd 遙かなる甲子園 (1990)
 港 (Minato, lit. "Port") (1993)
 とられてたまるか！？ (1994)
 ランニング・フリー (Running Free) (2001)
 Close-Knit (2017)
 Mixed Doubles (2017)
 Asako I & II (2018)
 Threads: Our Tapestry of Love (2020)
 What Did You Eat Yesterday? (2021)
 Unlock Your Heart (2021), Izumi Shindo
 Riverside Mukolitta (2022)

Television
 Tokugawa Ieyasu (1983), Tokuhime
 Ai no Arashi (1986), adult Hikaru (Japanese adaptation of Wuthering Heights)
 What Did You Eat Yesterday?'' (2019)

References

External links

 Misako Tanaka's JMDb Listing (in Japanese)

1959 births
Living people
Japanese actresses
People from Shimane Prefecture